Cyana straminea is a moth of the family Erebidae. It was described by George Hampson in 1914. It is found in Taiwan.

References

Cyana
Moths described in 1914
Moths of Taiwan